ʿAli ibn ʿUmar Dīn, reigned 1553–1555, was a sultan of the Sultanate of Adal in the Horn of Africa. He was the son of Umar Din and the brother of Barakat ibn Umar Din.

See also
Walashmaʿ dynasty

References

Sultans of the Adal Sultanate
16th-century monarchs in Africa
16th-century Somalian people